Into the Land of Phantoms is the third studio album by American neo-cabaret artist Jill Tracy and the Malcontent Orchestra, released in 2002. It is their score to F.W. Murnau's 1922 silent vampire classic Nosferatu.

Track listing

2002 albums
Jill Tracy albums
Nosferatu